Bosara kadooriensis is a moth in the family Geometridae which can be found in Hong Kong, Taiwan, and Japan.

References

Moths described in 2002
Moths of Asia
Eupitheciini
Moths of Japan